The Witch is a 1952 Finnish horror film directed by Roland af Hällstrom and produced by Mauno Mäkelä. The film is based on Mika Waltari's 1947 play of the same name.

Premise 
The film begins with swamp digging archaeologists who find a naked girl buried in the mud hundreds of years ago as a witch. The resurrection of the girl named Birgit evokes horror, unrest, and passions on the local manor milieu; with her enchantment, the girl gets the local men in her traps and makes them a threat to each other.

Cast

Controversy 
The film is considered to be one of the first Finnish horror movies, along with Old Baron of Rautakylä (1923), Curses of the Witch (1927), Linnaisten vihreä kamari (1945) and The White Reindeer (1952).  The nudity scenes provoked a lot of controversy at the time, and helped the film to get sold to the United States and West Germany. In Finland, 14 meters of the film was censored, including the line: "I want to hold a young warm body in my arms – in the meadow, among flowers naked, in the warmth of fire, in the warmth of blood".

Reception 
The Witch won two Jussi Awards, one for Esko Töyri for best cinematography and another for Lauri Elo for best production design. Young actress Mirja Mane was both praised and criticized for her performance as the witch. The reception from female critics was mostly negative, while some of the male critics noted that Mane's performance reflected an obvious talent.

References

Films based on works by Mika Waltari
Finnish horror films
1952 films
Films about witchcraft
1952 horror films
Finnish black-and-white films
1950s Finnish-language films